Beyond the Sunset (飛越黃昏) is a 1989 film by Hong Kong director Jacob Cheung.

Cast and roles
 Fung Bo Bo - May
 Law Chi Wai
 Lowell Lo - Allen
 Richard Ng - Wong
 Alexander Roels - Derek
 Cecilia Yip - Pearl
 Fung So-Po 
 Hui Ying-Sau

Awards
It won Best Film, Best Screenplay and Best Supporting Actress at the 9th Hong Kong Film Awards.

References

External links
 
 HK cinemagic entry

1989 films
Hong Kong crime drama films
Best Film HKFA
Films directed by Jacob Cheung
1980s Hong Kong films